Shamika Bhide (born 15 February 1994) was a participant of the first season of the reality show Sa Re Ga Ma Pa Marathi L'il Champs aired on Zee Marathi channel. She is from Ratnagiri, a district in Maharashtra. She was one of the twelve finalists of this show. During this show, she was most appreciated for 'lavanis', a type of Maharashtrian folk music. She has also recorded recently for an Album named Aathva Swar.

Background
Shamika was born in Ratnagiri to Entrepreneurs Shrikant and Rashmi Bhide who are running business of Konkani food products. In the school days Shamika started contesting in so many competitions in district level and won awards too. She started primary education in classical music under the guidance Mrs. Mugdha Bhat-Samant. She had participated in Prashant Damle foundation's contests as well.

Her talent was showcased to the world and Ratnagiri was represented globally when she participated the enormously popular reality show, Sa Re Ga Ma Pa Marathi L'il Champs aired on Zee Marathi Channel from July 2008 to February 2009. Shamika was 14 years old then.

Career
In 2008, Shamika auditioned for the Sa Re Ga Ma Pa Marathi L'il Champs, a competitive music reality show organized by the Zee Marathi television channel. She was one of final 50 who were selected from amongst several thousand children aged between 8 and 14 across Maharashtra. She made her way to the top 10 finalists on the basis of her immense talent and singing capabilities.
Shamika was popularly referred to as the "Konkan Kanya", during the show.

Shamika displayed her versatile vocal talent by singing a wide variety of songs in the competition. She was expertise in Angai as well as Lavani's and Abhang's. Her song 'Khelatana rang bai hoLicha' or 'pavana alikaDacha' created the history in Sa Re Ga Ma Pa. After her LavaNi Judge Avadhut Gupte got impressed and requested Zee Marathi to conduct one whole episode for Lavani's. Texture of her voice quality is very good.
Many of the Experts have certified Shamika as 'the Perfect Playback Singer'. She has a Sharp and superb voice quality as per opinions of genius in music.

All of this achievement of Shamika is due to her own as well as her parents' huge efforts as well as hard work. After the end of competition, she appeared for examination in Music at Shruti Ambekar and now she is taking coaching under the able hands of Well known Vocalist Mrs. Ashwini Bhide-Deshpande. Apart from one biggest music career she had given outstanding performance in her studies too. She got huge marks 91% in her S.S.C. Examination.

On a new album by Varsha Bhave Aathawa Swar, Shamika has sung two songs.

Albums
 Aathava Swar composed by Varsha Bhave

Public appearances
Shaniwarwada Kala Mahotsav, Pune
Shravandhara by Yash Foundation, Ratnagiri
Bhide Kul Samelan, Ganpatipule
Ratnagiri Mahotsav, Ratnagiri
Ratnagiri Pulotsav, Ratnagiri
Utkrusht vammay nirmitee rajya purakar sohala, Ratnagiri
Nashik Road-DevaLali Vyapari Bank, Deepmahotsav, Nashik
Natya Samelan, Ratnagiri
Shimagotsava, Goa
Kojagar, Maharashtra Chitpavan Sangh, Pune
Raunak City Kalyan live Concert ( Diwali Celebration 2018 IGNIGHT )

References

External links
Esakal.com
Onlinenews1.lokmat.com
Rhythmhouse.in
Maharashtratimes.indiatimes.com
Konkantoday.com
Loksatta.in
 Maharashtratimes.indiatimes.com
72.78.249.125/esakal
Loksatta.com
Esakal.com
Onlinenews1.lokmat.com
Maharashtratimes.indiatimes.com 
Konkantoday.com

1994 births
Indian women playback singers
Living people
Marathi people
Marathi-language singers
Women musicians from Maharashtra
Sa Re Ga Ma Pa participants
21st-century Indian singers
21st-century Indian women singers